"In Heaven (Lady in the Radiator Song)" (often referred to as simply "In Heaven") is a song performed by Peter Ivers, composed by Peter Ivers, with lyrics by David Lynch. The song is featured in Lynch's 1977 film Eraserhead, and was subsequently released on its 1982 soundtrack album.

Cover versions
The song's co-writer, Peter Ivers, recorded a version in the late 1970s, though it was not released until its inclusion on the 2019 album, Becoming Peter Ivers.
Devo (sung by Booji Boy) covered the song live in 1978-1979 as the penultimate song in their set.
It was sung at the start of gigs by fans of Psychobilly band The Meteors. A Recording of this features on the start of their debut 1981 album 'The Case Of The Meteors In Heaven'.
A cover by Tuxedomoon with Winston Tong was released in 1980 on the multiband live album Can You Hear Me? Music From The Deaf Club, and later rereleased on their 1987 album Pinheads on the Move. A different live version was also released on their 1989 Ten Years in One Night live album.
Elements from the end of a Cardiacs song called "A Time For Rejoicing" at the end of their 1981 independent album called "Toy World" specifically reference this song.
Bauhaus covered the song on their regular set for their final UK tour in the summer of 1983 and was featured on the Rest in Peace: The Final Concert album. The band's former bassist, David J, later performed "In Heaven" live as a duet with Pixies singer Black Francis at a solo show at the Los Angeles Echoplex in December 2009.
It was covered by the Pixies in 1987 for their initial demo tape and was later released in 2002 on the Pixies EP. The band re-recorded the track for a session for John Peel's BBC radio show in May 1988, which was later released on the Pixies at the BBC album. The song was a regular part of the Pixies' setlist, and a live version by the band appeared as a B-side  of the "Gigantic" single, and was also included on The Complete B-Sides album.
A cover of the song appeared on the 1993 Miranda Sex Garden album Suspiria.
Icelandic band Bang Gang included a version of the song on their 1998 debut album You
American composer and producer Keith Kenniff covered the song on his 2007 album Ayres, under his Helios moniker.
Zola Jesus covered the song, retitled "Lady in the Radiator", as part of the David Lynch Foundation's "The Music of David Lynch" concert on April 1, 2015
Jazz guitarist Julian Lage gave the song an instrumental treatment on his 2019 record, Love Hurts.
 In 2019, indie pop band AJR used a sample from In Heaven in their song "Birthday Party" from the album Neotheater. The lines used were: "In Heaven, everything is fine. In Heaven, everything is fine. You've got your good things, and I've got mine."

References

1977 songs
Heaven in popular culture
Pixies (band) songs
Songs written for films
Song recordings produced by David Lynch
Songs written by David Lynch